Mahindra University is an Indian private university located in Hyderabad, Telangana, India, founded by Mahindra Group. Mahindra University is sponsored by Mahindra Educational Institutions (MEI), a subsidiary of Tech Mahindra, the flagship IT company of the Mahindra Group.

References

External links

Mahindra University
Private universities in India
2020 establishments in Telangana
Educational institutions established in 2020